Armored Task Force is a 2002 computer wargame developed by ProSIM Company and published by Shrapnel Games. The lead developer was ProSIM Company founder, Pat Proctor.

The game is a combat simulation, and it includes four campaigns. They are set in Death Valley, California; at the National Training Center in Fort Irwin, California; in a hypothetical World War III in the Fulda Gap; and in a fictional war in Iraq (the game was created before Operation Iraqi Freedom). It was built on the real-time gameplay of its predecessor, BCT Commander. It has an AI and hierarchy system that allows the players to command their forces from the individual vehicle.

The game engine for Armored Task Force inspired a series of prior ProSIM games, including The Falklands War: 1982,  Raging: The Second Korean War, and The Star and the Crescent.

References

2002 video games
Computer wargames
Shrapnel Games games
Video games set in California
Video games set in Iraq
World War III video games